Balkasar Bear Sanctuary, established in 2010 by Fakhar-i-Abbas of CBR, is an animal sanctuary in Balkassar, Chakwal District, Punjab, Pakistan. The sanctuary provides a retirement and rehabilitation home, and veterinary care for rescued bears from bear-baiting events. It houses the endangered species of Asian black bears and Himalayan brown bears. Balkasar Bear Sanctuary also has ornithology and herpetology research stations.

History
In 2000, Kund Bear Sanctuary was established by the World Society for the Protection of Animals (WSPA) through the efforts of Fakhar Abbas, president of WSPA member society Bioresource Research Centre (BRC). The park was a retirement and rehabilitation home to the rescued bears, who could never adapt to life in the wild, because as tame bears they are without teeth. "When our monitoring work officially started in 2003 there were around 300 bears used for baiting. Now, by our recent estimates, there are only around 70 left," said Abbas. With construction planning beginning in 2009, it was in 2010 when the first of many enclosures for a new planned sanctuary in Balkasar was finished. It aimed to provide a more "natural" environment for bears to live.

2010: Nowshera rescue and the blind "Fourth"
In late July 2010, heavy flooding resulted in severe damage at Kund Park in Nowshera. By early August 2010, it was reported that Babu, Sohrab and Maylu, three of the Asian black bears that were housed at Kund Park, were rescued from the flooded area and safely transported to a new sanctuary at Balkasar which was still very much under construction. In late 2010, a severely injured female Asian black bear was rescued after she was forced to fight dogs in a bear-baiting event by her owner Fida Hussain. The bear went blind due to her injuries and was kept in quarantine for veterinary care. She was named Chowti, meaning "fourth", and became the fourth resident at the sanctuary.

2011: Layyah and Muzaffargarh rescues
In January 2011, two female Himalayan brown bears, Bhoori and Leela, and a female Asian black bear, Kaali, were rescued from a village in Layyah District. WSPA reported that the owners had accepted the alternative livelihood package. Once Bhoori, Leela and Kaali got to the sanctuary, they received necessary medical care. In September 2011, three Asian black bears were rescued from Muzaffargarh and brought to Balkasar Bear Sanctuary. The males, Sawan and Azad, died while in medical care. Post-mortem analysis showed that the former died because of heart failure while latter died due to liver failure. The only female, Nita, survived her fellows and was released into her enclosure after treatment. In October 2011, three more female Asian black bears, Lala, Milla and Shama, were rescued and brought to the quarantine zone of the sanctuary, where they received treatment.

2012: Continued efforts, Pari's death
In January 2012, Milla and Shama were released from the quarantine zone into their enclosure shared with Nita. Lala was released in early May 2012 after receiving treatment for her muzzle. Three more bears were rescued in May 2012, a male Himalayan brown bear named Reech and two female Asian black bears Shabnam and Pari. Reech, now the largest and the only male brown bear at the sanctuary, required little treatment before his release. Shabnam was also released soon, but Pari was kept longer in the quarantine zone because of her injured paw.

On night of July 29, 2012, a few days after her release into the enclosure, Pari was presumably bitten by a poisonous snake and died the latter morning, which saddened the staff. Around the same date, three more rescued female Asian black bears, Rene, Sihu and Zilla, were brought to the sanctuary and released into their enclosures after treatment in August 2012. In late August 2012, two more female Asian black bears, Robin and Yarrow, were rescued and brought to the Balkasar Bear Sanctuary. They were released into their enclosure after veterinary care in early November 2012.

Inhabitants
The following bears live in the sanctuary, listed in order of induction:

References

External links
 Webpage at PBRC website
 Five bears released into Balkasar Sanctuary, September 2012 (Facebook photo album)

Chakwal District
Wildlife sanctuaries in Punjab, Pakistan
Wildlife sanctuaries of Pakistan
Wildlife rehabilitation and conservation centers
Protected areas of Pakistan